Jing Kevin Chen is an electrical engineer at the Hong Kong University of Science and Technology in Hong Kong. Chen was named a Fellow of the Institute of Electrical and Electronics Engineers (IEEE) in 2014 for his contributions to compound semiconductor heterojunction transistor technologies.

References 

Fellow Members of the IEEE
Living people
Academic staff of the Hong Kong University of Science and Technology
Chinese engineers
Year of birth missing (living people)